The Körnerpark is situated in Berlin Neukölln between  Jonasstraße, Schierker Straße, Selkestraße and Wittmannsdorfer Straße. The approximately 2.4 hectare (about 5.93 acres) park resembles a  palace garden. The feature in the eastern part of the park is a cascade with fountains. Opposite, to the west, an orangery houses a café and a gallery for temporary exhibitions, and forms the boundary of the park. During summer weekends the forecourt of the orangery is used for free concerts and performances. The northern part is dominated by a flower garden.

Development 

The park was built in a former gravel pit which its owner Franz Körner handed over to the former city of Rixdorf in 1910. The only condition was that the future park had to carry his name. Designed probably by Hans Richard Küllenberg the park was built between 1912 and 1916 in a Neo-baroque style.  Building the park the city fathers intended to provide the surrounding neighbourhood with an adorned mark encouraging the development of excellent and beautiful buildings thereby creating an exceptionally preferred residential area.

Due to the former use as gravel pit the park level is between five and seven metres below the surrounding street level. On three sides retaining walls border the park. Attached to the western wall is the orangery, similar to the situation in the gardens of Versailles. Along with the Märchenbrunnen in the Volkspark Friedrichshain and the cascade at the Lietzensee (lake near Alt-Lietzow) the Körnerpark is an outstanding example of Neo-baroque garden design in Berlin.

Restoration 
After World War II the park was exposed to increased dilapidation.  The location in the eastern approach path of Berlin Tempelhof Airport did not help its situation.  Based on still existing documents the garden was then restored at the end of the 1970s. In October 1983 the orangery was reopened as a gallery and in 2002 the cascade and the canals were renovated. Buckets with plants stand again on the forecourt of the orangery and the extensive areas of herbaceous plants have been restored.

Since 2 April 2004 Körnerpark is a listed historic garden.

Horse Rider Grave of Neukölln 

The site got some archaeological fame when on 23 January 1912 at the corner Jonas-/Selkestraße  the Horse Rider Grave of Neukölln was found during construction work. The grave dates from the Migration Period in the 5th and 6th century.

The rider was buried with his horse in a tomb of 2.50 metres depth. The dead man was about 40 years old. In the grave were also found remains of a leather belt (fitted with iron parts), bronze nails and an earthenware vessel. A long sword (spatha) lay diagonally on the corpse.

Bibliography 
 Clemens Alexander Wimmer: Parks und Gärten in Berlin und Potsdam; ed. Senator für Stadtentwicklung und Umweltschutz, Abt. III – Gartendenkmalpflege; Nicolaische Verlagsbuchhandlung: 3rd edition, Berlin 1989, p. 80–82.
 Adrian von Müller: Berlins Urgeschichte. Bruno Hessling Verlag, Berlin 1971, S. 58.
 Sabine Huth, Cordula Rinsche: Schlösser, Parks & Gärten in Berlin und Brandenburg. FAB Verlag, Berlin 1997, p. 226. 
 Senatsverwaltung für Stadtentwicklung und Umwelt:  Stadtgrün in Berlin – Urban Green Spaces in Berlin. booklet, Berlin 2012, p. 29.  (German/English)

External links 

 Website of Körnerpark (German)
 Neukölln online – Monuments in Rixdorf – Körnerpark (German)
 Landscape architecture online exhibition with several (partly historic) photos (German)
 Entry in Berlin Register of Historic Monuments (German)

References 

Parks in Berlin
Urban public parks
Heritage sites in Berlin
Neukölln
Buildings and structures in Neukölln
Buildings and structures completed in 1916
Archaeology of Germany